Guillem Vives Torrent (born 16 June 1993) is a Spanish professional basketball player for Joventut Badalona of the Spanish Liga ACB. He is also a member of the senior Spain national team. At a height of 1.92 m (6'3 "), he plays primarily at the point guard position.

Professional career
On 7 July 2014 he signed a three-year contract with the Spanish team Valencia Basket.

On 1 July 2021 he signed with Joventut Badalona of the Spanish Liga ACB.

Spain national team
Vives was a member of the junior national teams of Spain. With Spain's junior national teams, he played at the 2011 FIBA Europe Under-18 Championship, where he won a gold medal, and at the 2013 FIBA Europe Under-20 Championship, where he won a bronze medal.

Vives has also been a member of the senior Spain national team. With Spain's senior national team, he played at the EuroBasket 2015, where he won a gold medal, and at the EuroBasket 2017.

References

External links
Guillem Vives at acb.com 
Guillem Vives at draftexpress.com
Guillem Vives at eurobasket.com
Guillem Vives at euroleague.net
Guillem Vives at fibaeurope.com
 

1993 births
Living people
CB Prat players
FIBA EuroBasket-winning players
Joventut Badalona players
Liga ACB players
Point guards
Spanish men's basketball players
Basketball players from Barcelona
Valencia Basket players